Fuga: Melodies of Steel is a tactical role-playing video game developed and published by CyberConnect2. It is the fourth title in the company's Little Tail Bronx series and it serves as a prequel to Tail Concerto and Solatorobo: Red the Hunter. The game takes place in a war-torn world populated by anthropomorphic dogs and cats ("Caninu" and "Felineko" respectively, lit. "イヌヒト" and "ネコヒト" / "dog people" and "cat people"), where a group of children struggle for survival aboard a giant tank against soldiers from an enemy nation. It was released in July 2021 for Microsoft Windows, Nintendo Switch, PlayStation 4, PlayStation 5, Xbox One, and Xbox Series X/S. A sequel, Fuga: Melodies of Steel 2, was announced in July 2022 and is set for release in May 2023.

Premise
Fuga is set in a war-ravaged world where a village is destroyed by the fascist Berman Empire. Eleven child survivors band together after the attack and board a gigantic tank known as Taranis - a relic of an ancient but technologically-advanced civilization - in order to travel across the dangerous landscape and rescue their families who were taken prisoner. The Taranis houses a super weapon called the Soul Cannon which is capable of immense destruction at the cost of a crew member's life, with the main characters having to choose when and whom to sacrifice in order for the group to reach their destination. The game is separated into 12 chapters and features multiple endings depending on player choice and how many characters survive.

Development
In February 2018, CyberConnect2 announced a recruitment drive for its "Next Plan" project which would shift its design focus for the next decade to new, original titles. The first of these, Fuga: Melodies of Steel, was showcased at Anime Expo 2019 by the developer as part of its Little Tail Bronx series, and would be its first self-published game. It is the first strategy role-playing game in the franchise, and is designed to be similar to roguelike games where the story is advanced through trial and error. The setting was based on France during World War II and was given a tone where the main characters "will experience the horrors and cruelty of war" but will "depict the bright and joyful atmosphere that the Little Tail Bronx series is known for". The title is meant to be the first of three games from the company known as the "Trilogy of Vengeance" along with Tokyo Ogre Gate and Cecile - games built by smaller teams and development cycles connected by a common theme of vengeance. CyberConnect2 jump-started the project by establishing an in-house game design competition known as the "C5 Project Initiative" where ideas were gathered by various staff. Fuga was originally meant to be released along with the rest of "Vengeance" games by the end of 2019, but was pushed back until early 2020, then again to 2021. The game was released for the PlayStation 5 and Xbox Series X/S, in addition to the previously announced Microsoft Windows, Nintendo Switch, PlayStation 4 and Xbox One platforms, on July 29, 2021. The game had a development budget in excess of ¥327 million. In February 2022, creative director Yoann Gueritot announced via that Fuga would become a trilogy.

Reception

Fuga: Melodies of Steel received "generally favorable reviews" from critics according to review aggregator Metacritic.

Legacy
In August 2021, CyberConnect2 announced that a manga adaptation, titled Fuga: Melodies of the Battlefield, was in the works. Written and illustrated by Takafumi Adachi, the manga launched on December 7, 2021.

Notes

References

External links

Official Website

2021 video games
CyberConnect2 games
Dieselpunk video games
Little Tail Bronx
Nintendo Switch games
PlayStation 4 games
PlayStation 5 games
Role-playing video games
Single-player video games
Steampunk video games
Tactical role-playing video games
Turn-based strategy video games
Turn-based tactics video games
Unreal Engine games
Video games about cats
Video games about dogs
Video games developed in Japan
War video games
Windows games
World War II video games
Xbox One games
Xbox Series X and Series S games
Anti-war video games